Aleksa Denković (born 21 March 1997) is a Serbian football midfielder, playing for FK Budućnost Dobanovci.

Club career

OFK Beograd
As a member of Partizan youth, Denković joined OFK Beograd in summer 2014, together with his teammate from 1997 generation, Nemanja Belaković. After a season with youth team, he joined the first team of OFK Beograd for the 2015–16 season and made his SuperLiga debut in the 9th fixture, against Jagodina. He scored his first senior goal in 11 fixture match of the same season against Spartak Subotica, played on 26 September 2015.

Career statistics

Club

References

External links
 Aleksa Denković stats at utakmica.rs
 
 
 

1997 births
Living people
Footballers from Belgrade
Association football midfielders
Serbian footballers
OFK Beograd players
FK TSC Bačka Topola players
FK Sinđelić Beograd players
FK Budućnost Dobanovci players
Serbian First League players
Serbian SuperLiga players